Cassinia sifton, commonly known as sifton bush, is a species of flowering plant in the family Asteraceae and is endemic to south-eastern continental Australia and an introduced species in other places. It is a multi-stemmed shrub with linear leaves, and more or less conical heads of 50 to 200 deep red to pale brown flowers. It is sometimes confused with Cassinia arcuata and authorities differ on its distribution.

Description

Taxonomy and naming
It was previously included in C. arcuata

Distribution and habitat
Sifton bush is a pioneer plant, especially on poor soils, and often invades overgrazed pastures. It is widespread in central New South Wales and widespread and common in Victoria. In New South Wales it invades disturbed areas such as roadsides, cleared and ploughed areas and is classed as a weed. It has been introduced to the Australian Capital Territory, South Australia and Western Australia.

References

arcuata
Asterales of Australia
Flora of New South Wales
Flora of Victoria (Australia)